All for Mary is a 1955 British comedy film brought to the screen by Paul Soskin Productions for the Rank Organisation. It was based on a successful West End play by the English husband and wife team of Kay Bannerman and Harold Brooke. It was directed by Wendy Toye, produced by Paul Soskin with the screenplay by Paul Soskin and Peter Blackmore. It starred Nigel Patrick, David Tomlinson, Jill Day and Kathleen Harrison. Eastmancolor Cinematography was by Reginald H. Wyer.

Plot
Two young bachelors take separate skiing holidays at the same resort. Clive Morton and "Humpy" Miller have nothing whatsoever in common—except for one thing: both men fall for the hotel proprietor's daughter Mary. Clive (a debonair soldier and sportsman) gets quickly into his stride, whilst poor "Humpy" - a clumsy, incongruous fellow - looks on dumbly. However, "Humpy" has a secret weapon: Miss Cartwright, his former nanny, who arrives just as the pair are quarantined in the hotel attic after contracting chicken pox.  Quickly realising Humpy's predicament, she skillfully arranges for the removal of the opposition, leaving the way clear for "Humpy".

Cast
Nigel Patrick as Captain Clive Norton
Kathleen Harrison as Nanny Cartwright
David Tomlinson as "Humpy" Miller
Jill Day as Mary
David Hurst as Monsieur Victor
Leo McKern as Gaston Nikopopoulos
Nicholas Phipps as General McLintock-White
Joan Young as Mrs. Hackenfleuger
Lionel Jeffries as Maître D'Hotel
Neil Hallett as Alphonse
Paul Hardtmuth as Hans, Hotel Porter
Fabia Drake as Opulent Lady
Charles Lloyd Pack as Doctor
Guy Deghy as Ski Instructor
Dorothy Gordon as W.R.A.C. Orderly
Robin Brown as American Boy
Tommy Farr as Bruiser
Vernon Morris as Page Boy

Critical reception
In the 21st century, a TV Guide reviewer wrote, "This tired old formula is given the standard British treatment, resulting in an enjoyable, but far from classic comedy."

External links

References

1955 comedy films
1955 films
Films directed by Wendy Toye
British comedy films
Films shot at Pinewood Studios
British films based on plays
Films shot in Switzerland
Films set in the Alps
Skiing films
Films produced by Paul Soskin
Films with screenplays by Paul Soskin
1950s English-language films
1950s British films